The Church of Santa María de Junco is a Romanesque-style, Roman Catholic church located in the municipality of Ribadesella in Asturias, Spain. A church at the site was erected in the early 13th century.

Maria de Junco
Maria de Junco
Maria de Junco
Maria de Junco
Bien de Interés Cultural landmarks in Asturias